Bell station (formerly Hurst/Bell Station) is a Trinity Railway Express commuter rail station in Fort Worth, Texas. It is located on Bell Spur Drive at Trinity Boulevard. It opened on September 16, 2000, and serves the main plant of Bell Helicopter Textron. Bell station sits within the city of Fort Worth but is located within a Hurst Zip Code.

References

External links
 TRE - Bell Station

Trinity Railway Express stations
Railway stations in the United States opened in 2000
Railway stations in Tarrant County, Texas
Railway stations in Fort Worth, Texas